Hanno Kompus (real name Johannes Kompus, pseudonym HaKo; 4 March 1890 Rannu Parish, Tartu County – 25 October 1974 Montreal, Canada) was an Estonian art and theatre critic, art historian, theatre director and architect.

In 1918, he graduated from Riga Polytechnical Institute. In 1918 he participated on Estonian War of Independence. 1920-1922 he worked at Estonia Theatre. 1923-1936 he was an operatic director at Estonia Theatre. From 1936 until 1940, he worked at Riigi Ringhääling (State Broadcasting). Following the Soviet occupation of Estonia in 1944, he fled to Sweden, where he where he designed a number of small houses around Stockholm, illustrated Estonian language books and worked at several small Estonian language refugee and expatriate 
theatres. In 1951, he emigrated to Canada, where he established the Montreali Eesti Teater, where he acted as both a director and an actor.

Theatre productions

 Wagner's "Lohengrin" (1927)
 Aav's "Vikerlased" (1928)
 Nicolai's "Windsori lõbusad naised" (1930)
 Vedro's "Kaupo" (1932)
 Mozart's "Võluflööt" (1936)

References

1890 births
1974 deaths
Estonian theatre directors
Estonian art critics
Estonian art historians
Estonian architects
Estonian military personnel of the Estonian War of Independence
Riga Technical University alumni
Estonian World War II refugees
Estonian emigrants to Sweden
Estonian emigrants to Canada
People from Elva Parish